This is a list of episodes for Ohsama Sentai King-Ohger, a Japanese tokusatsu television drama. It is the fourth series in the franchise released in Japan's Reiwa Era and the 47th entry of Toei's long-running Super Sentai series produced by TV Asahi.

Episodes

References

King-Ohger
Ohsama Sentai King-Ohger